Sakasegawa Dam is an earthfill dam located in Tochigi prefecture in Japan. The dam is used for power production. The catchment area of the dam is 277 km2. The dam impounds about 2  ha of land when full and can store 92 thousand cubic meters of water. The construction of the dam was started on 1911 and completed in 1912.

References

Dams in Tochigi Prefecture
1912 establishments in Japan